Cecil Edey (born 12 March 1965) is an English retired professional footballer who played as a defender for Macclesfield Town in the Football League.

External links

1965 births
Living people
Footballers from Manchester
English footballers
Association football defenders
Macclesfield Town F.C. players
Stalybridge Celtic F.C. players
Hyde United F.C. players
English Football League players